Blue is a color.

Blue may also refer to:

Places 
 Blue, Arizona, an unincorporated community in the United States
 Blue, Indiana, an unincorporated community in the United States
 Blue, Oklahoma, an unincorporated community in the United States
 Blue, West Virginia, an unincorporated community in the United States
 Blue County, Choctaw Nation, dissolved in 1907 when Oklahoma achieved statehood
 Blue, Ontario, a former township amalgamated in Dawson, Ontario, Canada
 Blue Desert, part of the Sinai Desert
 Blue Mountain (disambiguation)
 Blue Mountains (disambiguation)
 Blue River (disambiguation)

People 
 Blue (name), a list of people with the given name, nickname or surname

Companies and products 
 Blue Inc, a London-based chain of fashion retail stores
 Blue Microphones, a microphone manufacturer
 Blue Network, an American radio network from 1927 to 1945, the predecessor of ABC
 Labatt Blue, a Canadian brand of beer
 Blue Origin, an American aerospace manufacturer

Computing and mathematics
 Blue (queue management algorithm)
 Best Linear Unbiased Estimator, a concept in statistics
 Windows Blue, codename for Microsoft Windows 8.1

Art, entertainment, and media

Fictional entities
 Blue (Blue Gender)
 Blue (Pokémon Adventures), the protagonist's rival in the manga adaptation of Pokémon in Pokémon Adventures
 Blue (SaGa Frontier character)
 Blue (Wolf's Rain)
 Blue Chessex, a character in Degrassi: The Next Generation
 Green (Pokémon Adventures), who was called Blue in the original Japanese version, in Pokémon Adventures
 Blue, a fictional character in the Web series Dick Figures, made by Mondo Media
 Blue (Pokémon), the rival character in the video games Pokémon Red and Blue, and the main inspiration for the anime character Gary Oak
 Blue, the title character of Blue's Clues
 Blue, a cat in U.S. Acres by Jim Davis
 Blue, a character in Snow by Orhan Pamuk
 Joseph "Blue" Pulaski, a character in the film Old School
 Blu, a Spix's macaw who is the protagonist of Rio and Rio 2
 Blue Sargent, a fictional character from The Raven Cycle novels, by Maggie Steifvater
 Blue, a Velociraptor in Jurassic World and Jurassic World: Fallen Kingdom
 Blue, a SilkWing in the novel series Wings of Fire
 Blue, a character in the Roblox video game Rainbow Friends

Films 
 Blue (1968 film), starring Terence Stamp
 Blue (1993 film), by Derek Jarman
 Three Colors: Blue, a French drama film by Krzysztof Kieślowski, part of the Three Colors trilogy
 Blue (2001 film), a Japanese romantic drama
 Blue (2003 film), a South Korean war film
 Blue (2009 film), a Bollywood action film

Games
 Pokémon Red and Blue, the first two games in the Pokémon franchise

Music

Bands 
 Blue (English group), an English boy band
 Blue (Scottish band), a Scottish pop rock band
 Bruford Levin Upper Extremities or B.L.U.E., a 1990s British rock group

Albums 
 Blue (Angela Aki album), 2012
 Blue (Closterkeller album), 1992
 Blue (Diana Ross album), 2006
 Blue (Double album), 1985
 Blue (Down by Law album), 1992
 Blue (Flashlight Brown album), 2006
 Blue (Gary Chaw album), 2006
 Blue (iamamiwhoami album), 2014
 Blue (The Jesus Lizard album), 1998
 Blue (Jonas Blue album), 2018
 Blue (Joni Mitchell album), 1971
 Blue (La! Neu? album), 1999
 Blue (LeAnn Rimes album), 1996
 Blue (The Mission album), 1996
 Blue (Phil Keaggy album), 1994
 Blue (Simply Red album), 1998
 Blue (Terje Rypdal album), 1987
 Blue (Third Eye Blind album), 1999

Songs 
 "Blue" (A Perfect Circle song), 2004
 "Blue" (A. S. Blue song), 2011
 "Blue" (Big Bang song), 2012
 "Blue" (Bill Mack song), 1958, popularized by LeAnn Rimes (1996)
 "Blue" (Joni Mitchell song), 1971
 "Blue" (Tiësto song), 2019
 "Blue" (The Rasmus song), 1997
 "Blue" (The Verve song), 1993
 "Blue" (Vivid song), 2011
 "Blue" (Yoasobi song), 2021
 "Blue (Da Ba Dee)", a 1999 song by Eiffel 65
 "Blue", by Angie Hart from the Buffy the Vampire Slayer episode "Conversations with Dead People"
 "Blue", by Beyoncé Knowles from Beyoncé
 "Blue", by The Birthday Massacre from Violet
 "Blue", by Calvin Harris from Ready for the Weekend
 "Blue", by Elastica from Elastica
 "Blue", by Eve's Plum from Envy
 "Blue", by Fine Young Cannibals from Fine Young Cannibals
 "Blue", by First Aid Kit from The Lion's Roar
 "Blue", by Freddie Hart from Country Love Ballads
 "Blue", by Helen Reddy from We'll Sing in the Sunshine
 "Blue", by Hikaru Utada from Ultra Blue
 "Blue", by The Jayhawks from Tomorrow the Green Grass
 "Blue", by Joni Mitchell, also covered by Cat Power from Jukebox
 "Blue", by Kevin Ayers from Yes We Have No Mañanas (So Get Your Mañanas Today)
 "Blue", by LaTour from LaTour
 "Blue", by Linkin Park from LP Underground 11.0
 "Blue", by Lolo Zouaï from High Highs to Low Lows
 "Blue", by Lucinda Williams from Essence
 "Blue", by Marina and the Diamonds from Froot
 "Blue", by Mika from My Name Is Michael Holbrook (2019)
 "Blue", by Orthodox Celts from The Celts Strike Again
 "Blue", by Peter, Paul and Mary from In Concert
 "Blue", by The Seatbelts from Cowboy Bebop Blue
 "Blue", by Serj Tankian from Elect the Dead
 "Blue", by Sigrid from How to Let Go
 "Blue", by The Smashing Pumpkins from Lull
 "Blue", by  Troye Sivan from Blue Neighbourhood
 "Blue", by Way Out West from Way Out West
 "Blue", by Wham! from Music from the Edge of Heaven
 "Blue", by Yngwie Malmsteen from Alchemy
 "Blue", by Zayn Malik from Mind of Mine
 "Blue (And Broken Hearted)", a song written by Lou Handman
"Blue", a song from Heathers: the Musical

Other music 
 Blue (piano concerto), a composition by Matthew King
 Blue (video), a DVD by the Birthday Massacre
 Blue (opera), by Jeanine Tesori and Tazewell Thompson, 2019
 Blue, a guitar owned by Billie Joe Armstrong
 Working blue, or "blue material," the use of impolite language in comedy or other entertainment

Publications 
 Blue (Australian magazine), a gay men's magazine
 Blue (Italian magazine), an erotic comic magazine
 Blue (manga), a 1997 yuri manga by Kiriko Nananan
 Blue (tourism magazine), a 1997-2003 American adventure travel magazine
 Blue, a 1991 novel by James Heneghan

Television 
 Blue (web series), an original production starring Julia Stiles on the WIGS YouTube channel
 "Blue" (Red Dwarf), an episode of Red Dwarf
 Blue, a defunct Greek-language music video channel operated by ANT1 Group

Animals and mascots 
 Blue (Don Cherry's dog), a dog owned by ice hockey commentator Don Cherry
 Blue (NFL mascot), the official mascot of the Indianapolis Colts professional American football franchise
 Blue, a mascot of the University of Kentucky Wildcats
 Butler Blue, a succession of live mascots of Butler University
 Polyommatinae, a subfamily of butterflies

Sports
 Blue (university sport), an award
 Blue, a slang term used to address a baseball umpire

Other uses 
 Blue, a doneness level of cooked meat
 Blue, a slang term used in performance art to denote obscene material 
 Blue School, a progressive independent school in New York City
 Blue state, a U.S. state with a tendency to elect Democrats
 Case Blue, the German World War II plan for its 1942 summer offensive against the Soviet Union
 USS Blue (DD-387), a Bagley-class destroyer in service from 1937 to 1942
 USS Blue (DD-744), an Allen M. Sumner-class destroyer in service from 1944 to 1971

See also 
 
 Bloo (disambiguation)
 Blu (disambiguation)
 The Blue (disambiguation)
 Blues (disambiguation)
 Bluing (disambiguation)